Jonathan Gruden (born May 4, 2000) is an American professional ice hockey forward currently playing for the Wilkes-Barre/Scranton Penguins in the American Hockey League (AHL) as a prospect to the Pittsburgh Penguins in the National Hockey League (NHL).

Playing career
Gruden played as a youth in the Michigan area with the Honeybaked under-16 program before he was selected to the USA Hockey National Team Development Program at the under-17 and 18 level, featuring in the United States Hockey League (USHL). In his first year of eligibility, Gruden was selected by the Ottawa Senators in the fourth-round, 95th overall, of the 2018 NHL Entry Draft. 

Committing to a collegiate career with Miami University, Gruden as a freshman in the 2018–19 season, collected just 3 goals and 15 points through 38 games. After just one season with the RedHawks, Gruden leave the program and was signed to a three-year, entry-level contract with the Ottawa Senators on April 3, 2019. 

Gruden in preferring to continue his junior development in the major junior Ontario Hockey League, signed a contract with the London Knights, having been previously selected by the club in the 2016 OHL Priority Draft, 100th overall. In joining the Knights for the 2019–20 season, Gruden was amongst the team's top scorers, finishing with 30 goals and 66 points through only 59 games before the season was cancelled due to the COVID-19 pandemic. 

Prior to the pandemic shortened 2020–21 season, Gruden was traded by the Senators, along with a 2020 second-round pick to the Pittsburgh Penguins in exchange for two-time Stanley Cup winning goaltender Matt Murray on October 8, 2020.

Personal
Gruden is the son of former NHL defenseman John Gruden, who played with the Boston Bruins, Ottawa Senators and Washington Capitals through his 10-year professional career. He is currently serving as an assistant coach with the Boston Bruins.

Career statistics

Regular season and playoffs

International

References

External links

2000 births
Living people
American men's ice hockey forwards
London Knights players
Miami RedHawks men's ice hockey players
Ottawa Senators draft picks
Pittsburgh Penguins players
Wilkes-Barre/Scranton Penguins players
USA Hockey National Team Development Program players